Carrick, Cumnock and Doon Valley (Gaelic: Carraig, Cumnaig agus Srath Dhùn) is a county constituency of the Scottish Parliament at Holyrood, covering parts of the council areas of South Ayrshire and East Ayrshire. It elects one Member of the Scottish Parliament (MSP) by the plurality (first past the post) method of election. Also, it is one of nine constituencies in the South Scotland electoral region, which elects seven additional members, in addition to the nine constituency MSPs, to produce a form of proportional representation for the region as a whole.

The seat has been held by Elena Whitham of the Scottish National Party since the 2021 Scottish Parliament election.

Electoral region 

The other eight constituencies of the South Scotland region are Ayr; Clydesdale; Dumfriesshire; East Lothian; Ettrick, Roxburgh and Berwickshire; Galloway and West Dumfries; Kilmarnock and Irvine Valley and Midlothian South, Tweeddale and Lauderdale.

The region covers the Dumfries and Galloway council area, the East Ayrshire council area, part of the East Lothian council area, part of the Midlothian council area, the Scottish Borders council area, the South Ayrshire council area and part of the South Lanarkshire council area.

Constituency boundaries and council areas 

The Carrick, Cumnock and Doon Valley constituency was created at the same time as the Scottish Parliament, in 1999, with the name and boundaries of an existing Westminster constituency. In 2005, however, Scottish Westminster (House of Commons) constituencies were mostly replaced with new constituencies.

The rest of East Ayrshire is covered by the Kilmarnock and Irvine Valley constituency, whilst the rest of the South Ayrshire is covered by Ayr constituency.

Following their First Periodic review into constituencies to the Scottish Parliament in time for the 2011 Scottish Parliament election, the Boundary Commission for Scotland recommended redrawing the Carrick, Cumnock and Doon Valley constituency. The electoral wards used in the current creation of Carrick, Cumnock and Doon Valley are:

 Kyle (South Ayrshire)
Maybole, North Carrick and Coylton (South Ayrshire)
Girvan and South Carrick (South Ayrshire)
Ballochmyle (East Ayrshire) 
Cumnock and New Cumnock (East Ayrshire)
Doon Valley (East Ayrshire)

Constituency profile and voting patterns

Constituency profile 
The rural constituency of Carrick, Cumnock and Doon Valley is a diverse and sparsely populated area made up of former mining communities, outlying suburban villages, fertile farmlands and coastal resorts. Carrick stretches along the rugged and idyllic Ayrshire coast between Ayr and Galloway, taking in Culzean Castle and the resorts of Turnberry, home to the renowned Turnberry hotel and golf course, and Maidens. The main population centres within Carrick are Girvan, which serves as the area's main harbour and the main town of the Carrick area, and Maybole, the historic capital of the kingdom of Carrick. To the north west of the constituency, are the former mining villages of Tarbolton, Annbank and Mossblown. The more affluent suburban villages of Dundoald, Loans, Coylton and Symington serve as commuter villages to Ayr, Prestwick and Troon. Cumnock, Doon Valley and Ballochmyle in the East Ayrshire section of the constituency housed the central headquarters of coal mining operations in the Ayrshire area prior to the industry's collapse in the 1980s. The area is predominantly composed of dispersed and deprived former mining communities such as Cumnock, New Cunmock, Dalmellington, Bellsbank and Patna. The Trade Union movement was particularly strong in the area during the 1980s and 1990s. Keir Hardie, who is regarded as one of the primary founders of the Labour Party, was active in organising a local trade union for miners in the area during the late 1800s,

Voting patterns 
At Westminster, the equivalent South Ayrshire and later Carrick, Cumnock and Doon Valley constituencies consistently returned Labour MP's since the 1930s. The area was among the most reliable and safest Labour areas in Scotland and the UK as a whole, with Labour continually gaining the majority of the vote in most electoral wards in the constituency. On a local level, Cumnock, Ballochmyle, Doon Valley, Maybole, Annbank, Tarbolton, Mossblown and parts of Girvan consistently supported Labour, with these areas making up the majority of the constituency. Rural and suburban areas in Kyle and Carrick have been more supportive of Conservative candidates in the past - including Coylton, Dundoald, Loans, Monkton, Symington, Dunure, Minishant and Girvan Ailsa at the 2003 local election for South Ayrshire. At the 1979 UK general election the Scottish Labour Party - a pro-independence breakaway group from the UK Labour Party - polled second place in the constituency at just 1,521 votes behind Labour's George Foulkes.

Although the SNP have traditionally performed poorly in Carrick, Cumnock and Doon Valley they were able to secure the Scottish Parliamentary constituency in 2011 with a majority of 2,581 votes. In 2016 Labour's support in the constituency slumped, with the Conservatives increasing their vote share by 9.7% to take 24.2% of the vote, narrowly behind Labour's 27.4%, allowing Jeane Freeman of the SNP to increase Adam Ingram's initial majority of 2,581 in 2011 to 6,006 in 2016 despite seeing little change in the SNP's vote share in the constituency, however the SNP have performed very well in recent elections

At the 2017 council elections, the Conservatives formed the largest party across the South Ayrshire section of the constituency through Kyle and Carrick, with the Labour Party remaining the largest party in Cumnock and Doon Valley in East Ayrshire. Conservative Bill Grant went on to gain the overlapping UK Parliament constituency of Ayr, Carrick and Cumnock with a 6% majority at the 2017 UK general election. The SNP regained this seat at the 2019 UK general election.

In 2021, the area returned the third largest swing towards the Conservatives in Scotland, who overtook Labour into second place in the constituency. The SNP's majority in the constituency was reduced from 6,006 to 4,337 votes.

Member of the Scottish Parliament

Election results

2020s

2010s

2000s

1990s

Footnotes

External links

Constituencies of the Scottish Parliament
1999 establishments in Scotland
Constituencies established in 1999
Scottish Parliament constituencies and regions 1999–2011
Scottish Parliament constituencies and regions from 2011
Cumnock
Dalmellington
Politics of East Ayrshire
New Cumnock
Mauchline
Politics of South Ayrshire
Girvan
Maybole
Tarbolton